Anthony W. Knapp is a mathematician.

Anthony Knapp may also refer to:

Anthony L. Knapp (1828–1881), U.S. Representative from Illinois
Justin Anthony Knapp (born 1982), Wikipedian
Tony Knapp (born 1936), British footballer

See also
Tony Knap (1914–2011), college football coach